Colerne Park and Monk's Wood is a 53.7 hectare biological Site of Special Scientific Interest in Wiltshire, England, notified in 1951.

The site is north-east of Colerne village, and its eastern part is in the floodplain of the small Bybrook River. The woodland includes ash and wych-elm, and has rare plants, some of them wet-loving.

Sources

 Natural England citation sheet for the site (accessed 24 March 2022)

External links
 Natural England website (SSSI information)

Sites of Special Scientific Interest in Wiltshire
Sites of Special Scientific Interest notified in 1951